Hectobrocha adoxa, the unadorned footman, is a species of moth of the subfamily Arctiinae first described by Edward Meyrick in 1886. It is known from the Australian states of New South Wales and Victoria.

The wingspan is about 30 mm. Adults have brown forewings with an indistinct pattern. The hindwings are plain pale brown.

References

Lithosiini